James Garvin may refer to:

James Louis Garvin (1868–1947), British writer
James Garvin (basketball) (born 1950), American basketball player 
Jimmy Garvin (born 1952), American professional wrestler
James B. Garvin, NASA scientist